Roses F.C., of Detroit, Michigan, was an early twentieth century U.S. soccer team.

History
In 1910, Roses won the Michigan State Soccer Football League (MSSFL) championship.  In 1917, Roses won the Michigan state championship.  The next league result came in 1918 when Roses won the Detroit District League (DDL).  In 1919, Roses won both the Michigan State Association Clan Campbell Trophy and the Detroit and District League championship.  They repeated as DDL champions in 1922 and 1923.  As for the National Challenge Cup, Roses entered every cup from the first in 1914 until at least the 1923 version.  In 1914 Roses was eliminated in the third round.  Its best year came in 1919 when they lost to Bricklayers and Masons F.C. in the quarterfinals.  The team was active through at least the 1925-1926 season.

Year-by-year

Honors
Clan Campbell Trophy
 Winner (1):  1919

League Championship
 Winner (5): 1914, 1918, 1919, 1922, 1923

References

External links
 Photo of 1917 Michigan State championship team

Defunct soccer clubs in Michigan
Soccer clubs in Detroit